Sikar Junction railway station is a model railway station in Sikar district, Rajasthan. Its code is SIKR. It serves Sikar city.

The station consists of four platforms. Sikar is connected through a broad-gauge railway line section to Delhi, Churu and Jaipur. And there is a proposal since 10 years for a new line Sikar to Nokha via Sujangarh.

Major trains
 Delhi Sarai Rohilla–Sikar Express
 Amrapur Aravali Express
 Mumbai–Jaipur Duronto Express

References

Railway junction stations in India
Railway stations in Sikar district
Jaipur railway division